Chan Everett Perry (born September 13, 1972) is a former American college and professional baseball player who was a utility infielder and outfielder in Major League Baseball (MLB) for parts of two seasons during the early 2000s.

Perry was born in Live Oak, Florida.  He attended Lafayette High School in Mayo, Florida, and played for the Lafayette Hornets high school baseball team.

Perry accepted and athletic scholarship to attend the University of Florida, where he played for coach Joe Arnold's Florida Gators baseball team in 1993 and 1994.  During the 1994 season, he had a batting average of .311, and led the team with seventeen doubles, fifteen home runs,  sixty-five run batted in, and a .984 fielding percentage.  The Gators posted a 3–2 record in the 1994 NCAA Division I baseball tournament, ultimately losing to the top-seeded Miami Hurricanes 10–6 in the final of the Atlantic I Regional.

The Cleveland Indians selected Perry in the forty-fourth round of the 1994 Amateur Draft.  He had two brief stints as an MLB player.  He played in thirteen games in a variety of infielder and outfielder roles for the Indians in 2000, with fourteen at-bats and one hit, one run, and a batting average of .071.  During the 2002 season, he appeared in five games as the first baseman for the Kansas City Royals with eleven at-bats, one hit, three runs batted in, and a batting average of .091.  Perry finished his professional career with two minor league teams in the Pittsburgh Pirates organization in 2003.

Perry is the younger brother of former MLB third baseman Herbert Perry.

See also 

 Florida Gators
 List of Florida Gators baseball players

External links 

Baseballcube.com profile
Baseball-reference.com profile

1972 births
Living people
Akron Aeros players
Altoona Curve players
Baseball players from Florida
Buffalo Bisons (minor league) players
Burlington Indians players (1986–2006)
Cleveland Indians players
Columbus RedStixx players
Florida Gators baseball players
Kansas City Royals players
Kinston Indians players
Major League Baseball designated hitters
Major League Baseball first basemen
Major League Baseball outfielders
Nashville Sounds players
Richmond Braves players
Wichita Wranglers players
People from Live Oak, Florida
Junior college baseball players in the United States